Villa romana de Río Verde is a Roman villa on the coast of Marbella, Spain.

Buildings and structures in Marbella
Rio Verde
Archaeological sites in Andalusia